2,5-Dimethoxy-p-cymene, or thymohydroquinone dimethyl ether, is a phytochemical found in the essential oils of plants within the family Asteraceae. These essential oils, which contain the compound as a major component of the oil, have antifungal, antibacterial,  and insecticidal properties.

Natural occurrence 
2,5-Dimethoxy-p-cymene occurs in a variety of different plants' essential oils. Examples include:

 Ayapana triplinervis (92.8%)
 Apium leptophyllum (50.7 to 80.24%)
 Cyathocline purpurea (57.4%)
 Arnica montana (32.6%)
 Laggera crispata (32.2%)
 Blumea perrottetiana (30.0%)
 Eupatorium capillifolium (20.8%)
 Sphaeranthus indicus (18.2%)
 Limbarda crithmoides (16.4)
 Bubonium imbricatum (16.2%)

Chemical synthesis
2,5-Dimethoxy-p-cymene can be synthesized from carvacrol by aromatic halogenation followed by nucleophilic substitution with sodium methoxide and Williamson ether synthesis using methyl iodide.

See also
Thymoquinone

References

Hydroquinone ethers
Fungicides
Insecticides
Alkyl-substituted benzenes
Isopropyl compounds
Methoxy compounds